Flowing Hair coinage was issued in the United States between 1793 and 1795. The design was used for the first half dime, half dollar, dollar, and the first two large cents.

Flowing Hair coins
Source:

 Silver center cent (1792)
 Chain cent (1793)
 Wreath cent (1793)
 Half disme (1792)
 Half dime (1794–95)
 Half dollar (1794–95)
 Dollar (1794–95)

See also
Draped Bust
Classic Head
Capped Bust
Seated Liberty
Stella, a $4 coin minted in both "flowing hair" and "coiled hair" varieties in 1879 and 1880.

References

1794 establishments in the United States
1795 disestablishments in the United States
1794 introductions
Historical currencies of the United States